Noble Craig (died April 26, 2018) was an American actor who became known for his roles in horror films after having lost both of his legs and one of his arms in the Vietnam War.

Military service
Craig was drafted into the United States Army on May 3, 1967, during the Vietnam War, and was sent to Vietnam in April 1969. On his twelfth day of duty while serving with the 82nd Airborne Division, he stepped on a buried artillery shell or land mine, causing him to lose both of his legs, his right arm, and most of the sight in his right eye.

Acting career
Craig made his acting debut in the 1973 film Sssssss, in which he played Tim McGraw, "the Snake Man". He later played a legless monster in the Poltergeist II: The Other Side and a sewer monster in Big Trouble in Little China, as well as a partially dissolved character in The Blob. He briefly portrayed Freddy Krueger in the climax of A Nightmare on Elm Street 5: The Dream Child, and played one of Herbert West's failed experiments in Bride of Re-Animator.

Filmography

References

External links
 

Year of birth missing
2018 deaths
American male film actors
20th-century American male actors
United States Army personnel of the Vietnam War